The electoral district of Pilbara is a Legislative Assembly electorate in the state of Western Australia. Pilbara is named for the region of Western Australia in which it is located. It is one of the oldest electorates in Western Australia, with its first member having been elected to the Second Parliament of the Legislative Assembly at the 1894 elections.

History

Pilbara (historically spelled Pilbarra) was created at the 1893 redistribution in the Constitution Act Amendment Act 1893, through which three new electorates were created in mining and pastoral areas. Its first member was elected at the 1894 election, and while normally a Labor-held seat, it has been held by the Liberals and their predecessors for significant terms. In 1898, its major settlements were Marble Bar, Nullagine, and Bamboo, and it included the southern Pilbarra goldfield.

Pilbara's second member, Walter Kingsmill, was a prominent member of Leake's opposition, serving as a Minister in the Leake, James and Rason governments between 1901 and 1906. The seat was first won for Labor at a 1906 by-election, which was won by Henry Underwood against Ministerial opponent John Marquis Hopkins. He became part of the National Labor movement led by John Scaddan in early 1917, and later served in a Nationalist ministry under Henry Lefroy as a minister without portfolio. He was defeated by a Labor rival, Alfred Lamond in the 1924 election, but on Lamond's retirement at the 1933 election, the seat became the only seat to switch from Labor to Nationalist in the State in what proved to be a disastrous election for the Nationalists which relegated them to third place behind the Country Party. Labor recovered the seat in 1939, who held it continuously until the 1974 election, when Charles Court's Liberals defeated Labor premier John Tonkin's one-seat majority. Labor recovered the seat when they won government again in 1983, with the seat's first female member Pam Buchanan, who later became a minister in the Lawrence government. In 1989, she shifted to the new seat of Ashburton, and Larry Graham won Pilbara for the Labor party. He resigned from the Labor party in 2000, and served as an Independent until his retirement at the 2005 election, and Labor's Tom Stephens, who had resigned his Legislative Council seat and unsuccessfully contested Kalgoorlie at the 2004 election, won the seat, which for one term was known as Central Kimberley-Pilbara due to a redistribution. The name reverted to Pilbara at the 2008 redistribution. At the 2013 election the seat was contested by National Party leader Brendon Grylls who gained the seat with 61.5% of the two party preferred vote. After one term as the member for Pilbara, Grylls was defeated at the state election in 2017 by Labor's Kevin Michel.

Geography
As of 2014, the electorate consists of the Shire of East Pilbara, the City of Karratha, as well as the Town of Port Hedland

Before 2007, The Pilbara electorate contained the eastern parts of the Shire of Ashburton, including the mining towns of Tom Price, Paraburdoo and Pannawonica; the Town of Port Hedland including Port Hedland; the Shire of East Pilbara including Newman and Marble Bar and extending to the eastern boundary of the State; and the western and northern sections of the Shire of Ngaanyatjarraku, which is relatively unpopulated (especially as it excludes the town of Warburton) was added in order to balance the land areas of Pilbara and Kalgoorlie. The area's economy is centred on mining, particularly iron ore, and a significant proportion of the voting population are Aboriginal.

The 2007 redistribution, which took effect at the 2008 election, resulted in the seat losing areas it had gained in the previous distribution, including Fitzroy Crossing and Halls Creek in the Kimberley region, but it gained the large town of Newman from the abolished Murchison-Eyre.

The 2011 redistribution, which took effect at the 2013 election, saw Pilbara gain the Shire of Roebourne from the renamed North West Central electorate, in exchange for the remnants of the Shire of Ashburton, and the Shire of Ngaanyatjarraku was ceded to the Kalgoorlie electorate. That theoretically increased Labor's hold on the seat, but the popularity of the WA Nationals' Royalties for Regions policy made it marginal, so much so that, at the election, it was comfortably won by the then Nationals' leader, Brendon Grylls.

Members for Pilbara

Results

References

External links
 

Electoral districts of Western Australia
1894 establishments in Australia
Constituencies established in 1894